Joffrichthys is a genus of prehistoric bony fish. This North American genus includes three species, J. symmetropterus, J. tanyourus and J. triangulpterus. The last species is known from the Paleocene of the Sentinel Butte Formation of North Dakota.

See also

 Prehistoric fish
 List of prehistoric bony fish

References

Prehistoric ray-finned fish genera
Osteoglossidae